Ramnagar was a town in Madhya Pradesh state in central India. It was located on the Son River in Satna District, approximately 60 kilometers from the city of Satna.

The town was affected by the Bansagar project. The town was completely submerged underwater and its inhabitants have been relocated to a newly developed and planned town called New Ramnagar. The inhabitants of the submerged town were provided monetary compensation and strips of land in the new town. Allegations of forcible acquisition, insufficient and/or delayed compensation in lieu of the land surrendered by the town's inhabitants have been made.

References 

Cities and towns in Satna district
Mandla